The Ondava is a river in eastern Slovakia, the northern source river of the Bodrog. Its source is in the Low Beskids (Eastern Carpathian Mountains), near the village Nižná Polianka, close to the border with Poland. The Ondava flows south through the towns Svidník, Stropkov and Trhovište, and through the Ondavská Highlands.

Near the village Cejkov, the Ondava joins the Latorica and forms the Bodrog river, itself a tributary of the Tisza.  The Ondava river is 44% regulated.

Tributaries
Major left tributaries – Mirošovec, Ladomírka, Chotčianka, Brusnička, Oľka and Ondavka.
Major right tributary – Topľa.
Minor right tributaries – Olšavanka and Trnávka.

References

Rivers of Slovakia